Keith Gogler (1 May 1923 – 24 August 1983) was an Australian cricketer. He played in nine first-class matches for South Australia between 1946 and 1949.

See also
 List of South Australian representative cricketers

References

External links
 

1923 births
1983 deaths
Australian cricketers
South Australia cricketers
People from Port Augusta